Sadhvi Krishnapriya (born January 26, 1997) is an Indian motivational speaker, social worker and devotional singer. She is best known for her motivational speeches and socialist works.  She is the founder of Chain Bihari Ashraya Foundation.

Biography 
Sadhvi Krishnapriya was born on January 26, 1997, in Vrindavan, Mathura, Uttar Pradesh in a Brahmin family.

She received guidance from Shri RupKishor Das Maharaj in 2003, who was a spiritual saint of Vrindavan. She has performed more than 360 Bhagavad Katha. She has sung the devotional songs like Barsane Wali Shri Radha, Jabse Bihari Ji Se Nazar Mili Hai, Mere Man Ki Har Lo Badha and Tu Jap Le Radha Radha.

Discography 

 Barsane Wali Shri Radha
 Jabse Bihari Ji Se Nazar Mili Hai
 Mere Man Ki Har Lo Badha
 Tu Jap Le Radha Radha
 Mujhe Tera Sahara Sada Chahiye
 Main Gokul Ki Gujari
 Jab Se Bihari Se Nazar Mili Hai
 Man Mohan Tujhe Rijhau

References 

1997 births
21st-century Indian women singers
21st-century Indian singers
Indian motivational speakers
Living people
People from Mathura
Singers from Uttar Pradesh